William Welsh was an English professional footballer who played as a wing half.

References

English footballers
Association football wing halves
Grimsby Town F.C. players
English Football League players